Lauren Elizabeth Jenkins (born September 16, 1991) is an American singer-songwriter, actress, and director. Throughout her teenage years, Jenkins performed regularly at nightclubs in various states, before settling in New York City to study acting. While involved with the film industry, she landed the role of Trey Campbell in Deadline (2012). Big Machine Records would sign Jenkins as a recording artist in 2013 and release her debut extended play (EP) The Nashville Sessions EP in 2016. This was followed by her debut studio album, No Saint (2019), which ranked on Billboard Top Country Albums and Heatseekers Albums charts. After being removed from Big Machine's roster in March 2020, she independently released her second EP Miles on Me, Part 1 in July 2021.

Life and career

1991–2012: Early life and career beginnings
Lauren Elizabeth Jenkins was born on September 16, 1991 in Arlington, Texas and raised in South Carolina. When she was six years old, her father took her to her first concert and around the age of eight, she began writing songs. As a child, she often attended concerts with her father. Jenkins stated that her musical inspirations include "acts like Tom Petty and The Allman Brothers Band". She has a younger sister which she considers one of her role models. At age 15, Jenkins bought a car and an acoustic guitar and moved to Memphis, Tennessee. She began homeschooling so she "could travel and pursue music". Around that time, she was earning money from various odd jobs, which included modeling for Mello Yello and hosting a wrestling television show. Jenkins sang in nightclubs using a fake identity document on the East Coast. She attended open mic nights and tried performing in coffee shops and airports throughout North Carolina when she was a teenager. Jenkins also briefly resided in Charlotte, North Carolina. After performing regularly in New York City, Jenkins would settle there for performance opportunities and to attend the William Esper Studio school for acting. While splitting her time between New York City and Los Angeles, Jenkins worked on the set of Cigarette Girl (2009) and starred as a bartender in both N-Secure (2010) and Tough Trade (2010). In 2012, she was given the lead role of Trey Campbell in Deadline (2012).

2013–2019: Signing with Big Machine and No Saint
Trey Bruce, Jenkins's producer, sent demos he had worked on with her to various record labels in 2013. Bruce received a phone call from Big Machine Records's CEO Scott Borchetta which resulted in Jenkins booking a flight to Nashville, Tennessee the next day. She would sign a record deal with Big Machine in the same year. Among others, Jenkins was one of the opening acts for Brantley Gilbert, The Band Perry and Justin Moore for the Super Weekend at the Brickyard event held in July 2014. The aforementioned label released a Mötley Crüe tribute album titled Nashville Outlaws: A Tribute to Mötley Crüe in August, which includes a country cover of the band's "Looks That Kill" by Jenkins. In March 2016, it was reported that she would be one of the acts performing at the Carolina Country Music Fest held in June. On May 27, 2016, Big Machine released The Nashville Sessions EP as Jenkins's debut extended play (EP) which "captures [Jenkins's] love of country, Southern rock and Americana", according to James Reed of Rolling Stone. She co-wrote four of the songs and also covered Robert Palmer's "Addicted to Love" and Mötley Crüe's "Looks That Kill" on it. Furthermore, Jenkins was an opening act for Lady A and LeAnn Rimes during the summer of 2016. In 2017, she directed a music video for fellow singer-songwriter Ingrid Andress's single "The Stranger". 

Jenkins was one of the performers which sang at Alliance Films's 20th annual convention in August 2018. Big Machine released "Give Up the Ghost" as her debut single in October 2018, however it was not serviced to radio stations as she wanted to "give people a chance" to see if they would like it. On November 16, Jenkins announced that her debut studio album, titled No Saint, was set for release on March 15, 2019. She released a single, "Maker's Mark and You", on the same day. Bobby Bones selected Jenkins as part of his "Class of 2019" artists in January 2019. Upon being chosen as Elvis Duran's Artist of the Month in February, she made her debut on Today on the seventh of that month. Two days before her first album's release, Jenkins premiered its accompanying short film Running out of Road (2019), which she co-directed and starred in, at the Violent Crown Cinema during the Austin City Limits Music Festival. No Saint was issued on March 15, 2019, by Big Machine. The record consists of an Americana, country, indie, pop and rock sound; she co-wrote every song on the album. No Saint was released to positive reviews, and peaked at numbers 7 and 18 on Billboard Heatseekers Albums and Top Country Albums charts, respectively. Jenkins performed songs from the album at Billboard and CMT's "Billboard Live Featuring CMT Next Women Of Country" event in May 2019. In June 2019, she was one of the performing artists at CMA Music Festival.

2020–present: Departure from Big Machine and Miles on Me
In early 2020, Jenkins was the supporting act for the European leg of Brett Eldredge's tour. On March 5, 2020, Jenkins learned from a Big Machine staffer that the label had dropped her. Additionally, Jenkins was going to embark on a European and United Kingdom tour in the same year, which was ultimately canceled. Her first independent release was "Ain't That Hard", which was unveiled in May 2020. Jenkins revealed in July 2021 that her second EP, Miles on Me, would be released in three parts, with its first part being released in the same month. She told American Songwriter that when the COVID-19 pandemic began, she abandoned work on her second studio album and instead conceived Miles on Me over three studio sessions throughout 2020.

Artistry and personal life
Reed labeled Jenkins a "natural country-pop star" and MusicRow Liza Anderson described her as an "Americana singer-songwriter". In reviews of No Saint, music critics highlighted Jenkins's vocal delivery. AllMusic's Stephen Thomas Erlewine wrote that her voice is the "first striking thing" when listening to the album. According to Tom Roland from Billboard, Jenkins's voice makes use of "multiple personalities". He regarded her lower resonance as "haunting and spooky" as well as her upper register being "biting and forceful". Marissa R. Moss of Rolling Stone stated that Jenkins was "never afraid" to showcase her vocal delivery on No Saint. Billboard Annie Reuter noted that Jenkins has been recognized for her "smoky vocals and vivid storytelling". Jenkins's vocals have also been compared to those of Norah Jones, Sheryl Crow, and Stevie Nicks. No Saint comprises themes of romance, self-doubt, and drinking alcohol.

On April 10, 2019, Jenkins's backpack which contained her personal possessions including diaries and unfinished songs, was stolen. Throughout 2020, she performed live on social media platforms to help sustain herself and had given over 100 concerts by October. According to Jenkins, the tips she received from the viewers were "paying [her] bills". In 2022, she had hip replacement surgery as she suffered from chronic pain which was caused by extensive touring. During a songwriter's event at Napa, California in 2021, Patrick Davis proposed to Jenkins. They wed on October 15, 2022 at Lookout Mountain, Georgia. Jenkins moved to Nashville, Tennessee in 2013, where she currently resides with Davis. The couple performed at Bret Saberhagen's cancer charity event "Strike Out" in September 2022.

Discography

Studio albums

Extended plays

Singles

As lead artist

Promotional singles

Guest appearances

Filmography

References

External links
Lauren Jenkins official website

Lauren Jenkins at MusicBrainz
Lauren Jenkins at AllMusic

1991 births
Living people
21st-century American actresses
21st-century American singers
21st-century American women singers
American country singer-songwriters
American women country singers
American music video directors
Big Machine Records artists
Country musicians from Texas
People from Arlington, Texas
Singer-songwriters from Texas
Americana musicians